Carl Carlsson Mörner (1 December 1755 in Jönköping – 24 June 1821 in Stockholm) was a Swedish nobleman, officer, and politician.  After rising through the ranks after being accepted as a cadet in 1771, he was made field marshal in 1816, and served as Governor-general of Norway from 1816 to 1818.  He was made count of Tuna in 1800. He was married to Charlotta Arfwedson, was commonly known to be his political adviser.

References

External links

Swedish nobility
Governors-general of Norway
Lord Marshals of the Riksdag of the Estates
Knights of the Order of Charles XIII
1755 births
1821 deaths
Swedish military commanders of the Napoleonic Wars
19th-century Swedish politicians